Secondary Highway 535, commonly referred to as Highway 535, is a provincially maintained secondary highway in the Canadian province of Ontario. Passing through the municipalities of Markstay-Warren, St. Charles and French River, the highway extends , generally south to north, from a junction with Highway 64 in Noelville to Riviere Veuve, intersecting Highway 17 in the village of Hagar along the way.

Route description 

Highway 535 is a generally straight route oriented in a north–south direction through parts of the Canadian Shield. The two lane highway begins at a junction with Highway 64 in the town of Noëlville, where it is known as David Street North. It proceeds directly north in a straight line for almost , crossing the Wolseley River en route. The highway eventually diverges from its straight course prior to crossing the French River at West Arm. It zigzags its way north through rough terrain for several kilometres, passing through several rock outcroppings.

Eventually, the route straightens once more, then curves east and enters St. Charles. Within the village, drivers must turn at a stop sign to remain on Highway 535. Immediately north of Highway 17, the route crosses the Veuve River and then a rail line. The roadway continues north as Boundary Road into the wilderness.

History 
The current route of Highway 535 was first assumed by the Department of Highways in early 1956, along with several dozen other secondary highways. It was likely maintained as a development road prior to that. It formed the final  of Highway 556.

Major intersections 
The following table lists the major junctions along Highway 535. The entirety of the route is located within Sudbury District.
{| class="wikitable" style="width:100%;"
|-
!scope="col"|Location
!scope="col"|km
!scope="col"|Destinations
!scope="col"|Notes
|-
|Noelville
|0.0
|
|
|-
|Hagar
|38.4
|
|Trans-Canada Highway 
|-
|Riviere Veuve
|48.7
|Sauve Road / Labelle Road
|

References 

535
Roads in Sudbury District